In physics, quantization (in British English quantisation) is the  systematic transition procedure from a classical understanding of physical phenomena to a newer understanding known as quantum mechanics.  It is a procedure for constructing  quantum mechanics from classical mechanics.  A generalization involving infinite degrees of freedom  is field quantization, as in the "quantization of the electromagnetic field", referring to photons as field "quanta" (for instance as light quanta). This procedure is basic to theories of atomic physics, chemistry, particle physics, nuclear physics, condensed matter physics, and quantum optics.

Historical overview 
In 1901, when Max Planck was developing the distribution function of statistical mechanics to solve ultraviolet catastrophe problem, he realized that the properties of blackbody radiation can be explained by the assumption that the amount of energy must be in countable fundamental units, i.e. amount of energy is not continuous but discrete. That is, a minimum unit of energy exists and the following relationship holds 
for the frequency . Here,  is called Planck's constant and is a unique constant representing the amount of the quantum mechanical effect. It means a fundamental change of mathematical model of physical quantities.

In 1905, Albert Einstein published a paper, "On a heuristic viewpoint concerning the emission and transformation of light", which explained the photoelectric effect on quantized electromagnetic waves. The energy quantum referred to in this paper was later called "photon".  In July 1913, Niels Bohr used quantization to describe the spectrum of a hydrogen atom in his paper "On the constitution of atoms and molecules". 

The preceding theories have been successful, but they are very phenomenological theories.  However, the French mathematician Henri Poincaré first gave a systematic and rigorous definition of what quantization is in his 1912 paper "Sur la théorie des quanta". 

The term "quantum physics" was first used in Johnston's Planck's Universe in Light of Modern Physics.  (1931).

Canonical quantization 

Canonical quantization  develops quantum mechanics from classical mechanics.  One introduces a commutation relation  among canonical coordinates. Technically, one converts  coordinates to operators, through combinations of creation and annihilation operators. The operators act on quantum states of the theory. The lowest energy state is called the vacuum state.

Quantization schemes 
Even within the setting of canonical quantization, there is difficulty associated to quantizing arbitrary observables on the classical phase space. This is the ordering ambiguity: Classically, the position and momentum variables x and p commute, but their quantum mechanical operator counterparts do not. Various quantization schemes have been proposed to resolve this ambiguity, of which the most popular is the Weyl quantization scheme. Nevertheless, the Groenewold–van Hove theorem  dictates that no perfect quantization scheme exists. Specifically, if the quantizations of x and p are taken to be the usual position and momentum operators, then no quantization scheme can perfectly reproduce the Poisson bracket relations among the classical observables. See Groenewold's theorem for one version of this result.

Covariant canonical quantization 

There is a way to perform a canonical quantization without having to resort to the non covariant approach of foliating spacetime and choosing a Hamiltonian. This method is based upon a classical action, but is different from the functional integral approach.

The method does not apply to all possible actions (for instance, actions with a noncausal structure or actions with gauge "flows"). It starts with the classical algebra of all (smooth) functionals over the configuration space. This algebra is quotiented over by the ideal generated by the Euler–Lagrange equations. Then, this quotient algebra is converted into a Poisson algebra by introducing a Poisson bracket derivable from the action, called the Peierls bracket. This Poisson algebra is then ℏ -deformed in the same way as in canonical quantization.

In quantum field theory, there is also a way to quantize actions with gauge "flows". It involves the Batalin–Vilkovisky formalism, an extension of the BRST formalism.

Deformation quantization 

One of the earliest attempts at a natural quantization was Weyl quantization, proposed by Hermann Weyl in 1927.   Here, an attempt is made to associate a quantum-mechanical observable (a self-adjoint operator on a Hilbert space) with a real-valued function on classical phase space. The position and momentum in this phase space are mapped to the generators of the Heisenberg group, and the Hilbert space appears as a group representation of the Heisenberg group. In 1946, H. J. Groenewold considered the product of a pair of such observables and asked what the corresponding function would be on the classical phase space. This led him to discover the phase-space star-product of a pair of functions.
More generally, this technique leads to deformation quantization, where the ★-product is taken to be a deformation of the algebra of functions on a symplectic manifold or Poisson manifold. However, as a natural quantization scheme (a functor), Weyl's map is not satisfactory. 

For example, the Weyl map of the classical angular-momentum-squared is not just the quantum angular momentum squared operator, but it further contains a constant term . (This extra term offset  is pedagogically significant, since it accounts for the nonvanishing angular momentum of the ground-state Bohr orbit in the hydrogen atom, even though the standard QM ground state of the atom has vanishing .)

As a mere representation change, however, Weyl's map is useful and important, as it underlies the alternate equivalent phase space formulation of conventional quantum mechanics.

Geometric quantization 

In mathematical physics, geometric quantization is a mathematical approach to defining a quantum theory corresponding to a given classical theory. It attempts to carry out quantization, for which there is in general no exact recipe, in such a way that certain analogies between the classical theory and the quantum theory remain manifest. For example, the similarity between the Heisenberg equation in the Heisenberg picture of quantum mechanics and the Hamilton equation in classical physics should be built in.

A more geometric approach to quantization, in which the classical phase space can be a general symplectic manifold, was developed in the 1970s by Bertram Kostant and Jean-Marie Souriau. The method proceeds in two stages. First, once constructs a "prequantum Hilbert space" consisting of square-integrable functions (or, more properly, sections of a line bundle) over the phase space. Here one can construct operators satisfying commutation relations corresponding exactly to the classical Poisson-bracket relations. On the other hand, this prequantum Hilbert space is too big to be physically meaningful. One then restricts to functions (or sections) depending on half the variables on the phase space, yielding the quantum Hilbert space.

Loop quantization 

See Loop quantum gravity.

Path integral quantization 

A classical mechanical theory is given by an action with the permissible configurations being the ones which are extremal with respect to functional variations of the action. A quantum-mechanical description of the classical system can also be constructed from the action of the system by means of the path integral formulation.

Quantum statistical mechanics approach 

See Uncertainty principle.

Schwinger's variational approach 

See Schwinger's quantum action principle.

See also 

 First quantization
 Feynman path integral
 Light front quantization
 Photon polarization
 Quantum Hall effect
 Quantum number
 Stochastic quantization

References 
 Abraham, R. & Marsden (1985): Foundations of Mechanics, ed. Addison–Wesley, 
Ali, S. T., & Engliš, M. (2005). "Quantization methods: a guide for physicists and analysts". Reviews in Mathematical Physics  17 (04), 391-490. 
  
 G. Giachetta, L. Mangiarotti, G. Sardanashvily, Geometric and Algebraic Topological Methods in Quantum Mechanics (World Scientific, 2005) 
 
 M. Peskin, D. Schroeder, An Introduction to Quantum Field Theory (Westview Press, 1995) 
 Todorov, Ivan (2012). "Quantization is a mystery." arXiv preprint arXiv:1206.3116 (2012)
 Weinberg, Steven, The Quantum Theory of Fields (3 volumes)

Notes

Physical phenomena
Theoretical physics
Quantum field theory
Mathematical quantization
Mathematical physics